Burgstraße is a metro station located at Hammer Landstraße in Hamm, Hamburg, Germany. Hamm is part of the borough of Hamburg-Mitte. The underground station is served by Hamburg U-Bahn lines U2 and U4.

Service 
Burgstraße U-Bahn station is served by Hamburg U-Bahn lines U2 and U4; departures are every 5 minutes.

Gallery

See also 

 List of Hamburg U-Bahn stations

References

External links 
 
 Line and route network plans at hvv.de 

Hamburg U-Bahn stations in Hamburg
U2 (Hamburg U-Bahn) stations
U4 (Hamburg U-Bahn) stations
Buildings and structures in Hamburg-Mitte
Railway stations in Germany opened in 1967
1967 establishments in West Germany